Boulevard! A Hollywood Story is a 2021 American documentary film by Jeffrey Schwarz. It is the story of Gloria Swanson's attempt to adapt a musical version of Billy Wilder's 1950 film Sunset Boulevard with composers Dickson Hughes and Richard Stapley.

Awards and nominations

References

External links 
 
 

2021 films
2021 documentary films
Documentary films about women writers
Documentary films about film directors and producers
American documentary films
Biographical documentary films
Films directed by Jeffrey Schwarz
Documentary films about LGBT topics
2020s English-language films
2020s American films